StumpWM is a tiling window manager that was created when developer Shawn Betts found ratpoison growing increasingly large and "lispy". Intended as a successor to ratpoison, StumpWM is released under the terms of the GPL-2.0-or-later license.

As explained on the StumpWM wiki, the developers decided to largely re-implement ratpoison in Common Lisp using CLX:

The authors describe StumpWM in the following terms:

Lisp and customization
StumpWM can be run in both Steel Bank Common Lisp (SBCL) and GNU CLISP, with SBCL generally being preferred for better performance. The SLIME environment is commonly used for applying real-time updates and customizations to StumpWM. There is also another program called  ("StumpWM Interactive Shell") that provides a standard way to interface with the window manager from a terminal.

Window manager customizations are stored in a  file that is found in the home directory of each user. This file contains Lisp code for configuring StumpWM.

Development
StumpWM source code is hosted on GitHub and the version control system used is Git. A mailing list is also available for StumpWM related issues.

See also

 Comparison of X window managers
 Sawfish, a stacking window manager written in Lisp
 Greenspun's tenth rule

References

Common Lisp (programming language) software
Free software programmed in Lisp
Free X window managers
Tiling window managers
X window managers extensible by scripting